The Icelandic Women's Basketball Supercup is a basketball super cup competition that opposes the latest winners of the Úrvalsdeild kvenna – the top-tier Icelandic national women's domestic league – and the winners of the Icelandic Women's Basketball Cup, the top-tier national women's cup competition in Iceland. Created in 1995, it is organised by the Icelandic Basketball Federation – who run the Úrvalsdeild and the Icelandic Cup, and it traditionally opens the season.

Title holders 
Keflavík are the record-holders with 11 cups.

 1995 Breiðablik
 1996 Keflavík
 1997 Grindavík
 1998 ÍS 
 1999 KR
 2000 Keflavík
 2001 Keflavík
 2002 Njarðvík 
 2003 Keflavík 
 2004 Keflavík 
 2005 Keflavík 
 2006 Haukar
 2007 Keflavík 
 2008 Keflavík  
 2009 KR 
 2010 KR  
 2011 KR 
 2012 Snæfell 
 2013 Keflavík  
 2014 Snæfell
 2015 Snæfell 
 2016 Snæfell
 2017 Keflavík 
 2018 Keflavík 
 2019 Valur
 2020 Skallagrímur
 2021 Haukar
 2022 Njarðvík

Recent finals

See also
 Icelandic Basketball League (Úrvalsdeild)
 Icelandic Basketball Cup
 Icelandic Basketball Federation

References

External links

Women's basketball competitions in Iceland
Women
Recurring sporting events established in 1995
Iceland
1995 establishments in Iceland